The 2000 estyle.com Classic was a women's tennis tournament played on outdoor hard courts. It was part of the Tier II category of the 2000 WTA Tour. It was the 27th edition of the tournament and took place in Manhattan Beach, California, United States, from August 7 through August 13, 2000. Fifth-seeded Serena Williams won the singles title and earned $87,000 first-prize money.

Finals

Singles

 Serena Williams defeated  Lindsay Davenport, 4–6, 6–4, 7–6(7–1)
 It was the 2nd title in the season for Williams and the 7th title in her singles career.

Doubles

 Els Callens /  Dominique Van Roost defeated  Kimberly Po /  Anne-Gaëlle Sidot, 6–2, 7–5
 It was the 4th title for Callens and the 4th title for Van Roost in their respective doubles careers.

External links
 ITF tournament edition details
 Tournament draws

2000 WTA Tour
LA Women's Tennis Championships
2000 in American tennis
2000 in sports in California